Daniel W. Ames (17 June 1830 – 22 Feb 1911) was an American politician from Maine. Ames, a Republican, represented Portland in the Maine House of Representatives from 1883 to 1886.

He was originally from Norridgewock and married Sarah E. Wing there on September 19, 1851. His wife died two years later of consumption. In 1855, he was a postmaster and justice of the peace in Norridgewock. During the American Civil War, he was a member of the 1st Maine Volunteer Cavalry Regiment.

References

1830 births
1911 deaths
People from Norridgewock, Maine
Politicians from Portland, Maine
People of Maine in the American Civil War
Republican Party members of the Maine House of Representatives